Lee Chun-hee (born February 19, 1979) is a South Korean actor.

Career
Lee Chun-hee made his acting debut in the movie A Good Lawyer's Wife in 2003 and has since starred in several big screen roles such as The Aggressives (2005), Three Fellas (also known as Bar Legend, 2006), Humming (2008), Beautiful (2008), Barbie (2012), and Collective Invention (2015). He has also appeared on the small screen, notably in Conspiracy in the Court (2007), Smile, You (2010), Gloria (2010), Take Care of Us, Captain (2012), the sitcom One Thousandth Man (2012), and Dating Agency: Cyrano (2013).

Chun-hee earned the nickname "Chunderella" from his stint on variety show Family Outing, because the other cast members picked on him for being awkward and clumsy, particularly Kim Su-ro (nicknamed "Stepmother Kim"). He later shed that image on variety show Adrenaline, when his expertise with camping equipment led him to being called  "ChunGyver."

Personal life
Chun-hee married the Smile, You co-star Jeon Hye-jin on March 11, 2011. Their daughter, Lee So-yu, was born on July 30, 2011.

Filmography

Film

Television series

Variety show

Music video

Discography

Singles

Awards and nominations

References

External links

Lee Chun-hee at Management Soop

1979 births
Living people
South Korean male film actors
South Korean male television actors
Seoul Institute of the Arts alumni
South Korean Roman Catholics